Oscar Víctor Trossero (15 September 1953 – 12 October 1983) was an Argentine football striker.

Playing career

He started his career with Boca Juniors but soon left for Racing Club and then Unión de Santa Fe. He played in France where he was quite successful, scoring 48 goals in 114 appearances with FC Nantes, AS Monaco FC and Montpellier HSC. With Nantes, he won the Coupe de France in 1979 and the Division 1 title in 1979–1980. He then came back to Argentina with River Plate. On 12 October 1983, he died from a Cerebral aneurysm in the locker-room after a match against Rosario Central.

Honours
FC Nantes
 Coupe de France: 1978–79
 Ligue 1: 1979–80

References

External links
Profile at historiadeboca
Profile

1953 births
1983 deaths
People from Caseros Department
Argentine footballers
Argentine expatriate footballers
Association football forwards
Boca Juniors footballers
Racing Club de Avellaneda footballers
Unión de Santa Fe footballers
FC Nantes players
AS Monaco FC players
Montpellier HSC players
Expatriate footballers in France
Expatriate footballers in Monaco
Argentine expatriate sportspeople in France
Club Atlético River Plate footballers
Argentine Primera División players
Ligue 1 players
Sport deaths in Argentina
Association football players who died while playing
Sportspeople from Santa Fe Province